Profoundemonium is the second studio album by the band Trail of Tears. The cover art was designed by Travis Smith. It is the last album to feature female soprano Helena Iren Michaelsen, who left the band the year this album was made.

Track listing
"Countdown to Ruin" - 2:31	
"Driven Through the Ruins" - 5:48
"Fragile Emotional Disorder" - 6:41
"Profoundemonium" - 4:55
"Sign of the Shameless" - 4:08
"In Frustration's Preludium" - 1:59
"In Frustration's Web" - 5:04
"Released at Last" - 6:01
"Image of Hope" - 3:51
"Disappointment's True Face" - 7:30
"The Haunted" - 5:01

Personnel
 Ronny Thorsen - vocals
 Helena Iren Michaelsen - vocals
 Runar Hansen - lead guitars
 Terje Heiseldal - guitars
 Kjell Rune Hagen - bass guitar
 Frank Roald Hagen - synthesizers
 Jonathan Pérez - drums

Guests
Jan Vigeland - saw, accordion
Kjetil Nordhus - clean vocals

References

Trail of Tears (band) albums
2000 albums
Napalm Records albums
Albums with cover art by Travis Smith (artist)